Colin Waldron (born 22 June 1948) is an English former football defender. He spent thirteen seasons in the Football League and two in the North American Soccer League.

Waldron spent his youth in Oldham, Lancashire, beginning his career with nearby Bury, making 20 appearances. He then joined Chelsea before the 1967–68 season. Nine games into the season, Burnley purchased his contract for £30,000. He made his Burnley debut on 28 October 1967. He quickly became a fixture at centre back and was named captain in his second season with the club. Burnley won the Second Division in 1973 and were invited to play in the 1973 FA Charity Shield in which Waldron scored the winning goal against Manchester City. He ultimately played nine years and 308 games for Burnley before club turmoil in 1976 led the team to release the manager Jimmy Adamson and several players including Waldron. He then moved to Manchester United, for whom he made just three appearances before the Adamson-managed Sunderland purchased his contract. After two years with Sunderland, Waldron moved to the United States to play for the Tulsa Roughnecks. After spells with the Philadelphia Fury and Atlanta Chiefs, he moved back to England to play for Rochdale.

References

External links
Profile at StretfordEnd.co.uk

NASL stats

1946 births
Living people
Atlanta Chiefs players
Bury F.C. players
Burnley F.C. players
Chelsea F.C. players
English footballers
English expatriate footballers
Footballers from Oldham
Association football defenders
Manchester United F.C. players
Mossley A.F.C. players
North American Soccer League (1968–1984) players
Philadelphia Fury (1978–1980) players
Rochdale A.F.C. players
Footballers from Bristol
Sunderland A.F.C. players
Tulsa Roughnecks (1978–1984) players
English expatriate sportspeople in the United States
Expatriate soccer players in the United States